Dangerous is a 1985 album by American singer Natalie Cole released on May 15, 1985 through the Atco Records-distributed Modern Records label. The album reached peak positions of number 140 on the Billboard 200 and number 48 on Billboard R&B Albums chart.

Reception
The album reached peak positions at number 140 on the Billboard 200 and number 48 on Billboard‘s R&B Albums chart. The lead single "Dangerous" was a modest hit and peak top 20 on US R&B Songs and a top 10 chart hit on the US Dance Songs chart. "A Little Bit of Heaven" hit the top 10 on US Adult Songs and only reached number 81 on the Billboard Hot 100, it was used as a recurring love theme for Eden Capwell and Cruz Castillo on the television soap opera Santa Barbara.

Track listing

Personnel 

 Natalie Cole – lead vocals, backing vocals (2, 4, 5, 7, 8), vocal arrangements (2, 5, 7)
 Paul Fox – synthesizers (1)
 Charles Judge – synthesizers (1), synthesizer programming (3), bass programming (3), drum programming (3), arrangements (3)
 Rory Kaplan – synthesizers (1)
 Jamie Sheriff – synthesizers (1, 4)
 Stephen Mitchell – synthesizers (1), synthesizer programming (1), drum machine (1), arrangements (1)
 Greg Wright – synthesizers (2, 5, 7), arrangements (2, 5, 7)
 Michael Rochelle – synthesizer programming (2)
 Greg Phillinganes – additional synthesizers (3)
 Randy Kerber – keyboards (4, 6, 9), acoustic piano (4)
 Robbie Buchanan – additional synthesizers (4, 6, 9)
 David Joyce – keyboards (8), backing vocals (8)
 Michael Boyd – guitar (1)
 Paul Jackson Jr. – rhythm guitar (1), guitars (8)
 Josh Sklair – rhythm guitar (2), guitar solo (2), guitars (5, 7)
 Sheldon Sondheim – additional rhythm guitar (2)
 Roland Bautista – rhythm guitar (3), synth guitar (3)
 Dean Parks – guitars (4, 6), rhythm guitar (9)
 Nathan East – bass (1, 4, 6)
 Keith Nelson – bass (5)
 Freddie Washington – bass (8, 9)
 Craig Burbidge – drum programming (2)
 Larry Talbert – drum programming (2)
 John Robinson – drums (4, 6, 9)
 Robert Jacobs – Simmons drums (7)
 Robert Shipley – drum overdubs (8) 
 Paulinho da Costa – percussion (1, 3, 4, 6, 9)
 Gary Skardina – tambourine (1), arrangements (1, 4, 9)
 Marti Sharron – arrangements (1, 4, 9), BGV arrangements (1, 3, 4)
 Steve Forman – additional percussion (3)
 Jerry Hey – flugelhorn solo (4)
 Ron Brown – saxophones (5)
 David Majal Li – saxophones (5)
 Fred Wesley – trombone (5)
 Ray Brown – trumpet (5)
 Nolan Smith – trumpet (5)
 Marti Sharron – arrangements (1, 4, 9), BGV arrangements (1, 3, 4)
 Gene Page – arrangements (4, 6, 8), string arrangements (4, 9), rhythm arrangements (9)
 Alex Brown – backing vocals (1, 3, 4), BGV arrangements (1, 3, 4)
 Portia Griffin – backing vocals (1, 3, 4), BGV arrangements (1, 3, 4)
 Van Ross Redding – backing vocals (1, 3, 4), BGV arrangements (1, 3, 4)
 Eddie Cole – backing vocals (4, 5, 8), saxophone solo (7), arrangements (8)
 Katrina Perkins – backing vocals (8)
 Yasmin "Sissy" Peoples – backing vocals (8)

Production

 Paul E. Fishkin – executive producer 
 Marti Sharron – producer (1, 3, 4, 6, 9)
 Gary Skardina – producer (1, 3, 4, 6, 9), engineer (1, 3, 4, 6, 9), mixing (6, 9)
 Harold Beatty – producer (2, 5, 7)
 Eddie Cole – producer (8)
 Natalie Cole – producer (8)
 Steve Thompson – additional producer, mixing
 Michael Barbiero – mixing 
 Craig Burbidge – recording (2, 5)
 Michael Mancini – string engineer (4)
 Mark Wolfson – recording (8), mixing (8), string engineer (9)
 Bill Bottrell – mixing (1)
 Taavi Mote – mixing (2, 5)
 Mick Guzauski – mixing (3, 4)
 Jon Ingoldsby – additional engineer (1, 3, 4, 6), assistant engineer (9)
 Casey McMackin – additional engineer (1, 3, 4, 6), assistant engineer (9)
 Robert Feist – additional engineer (3, 4), assistant engineer (9)
 Stan Katayama – assistant engineer (2)
 Peggy McAffee – assistant engineer (2), mix assistant (8)
 Daren Klein – assistant engineer (3, 4)
 Kirk Butler – recording assistant (8)
 Peter Lewis – recording assistant (8), string engineer (9)
 Steve Hug – recording assistant (8)
 Greg Penny – assistant engineer (9)
 Stephen Marcussen – mastering 
 Karin Patterson – production coordinator (2, 5, 7)
 Aaron Rapoport – photography 
 Keith Hodges – clothes
 Adrian Houghton – hair stylist 
 Jeff Angel – make-up
 Dan Cleary – management

Charts

References

1985 albums
Albums arranged by Gene Page
Dance-rock albums
Modern Records (1980) albums
Natalie Cole albums